Chorpan Tarkhan is recorded by Moses of Kalankatuyk as a Khazar general, who conquered Armenia in April 630 CE. He was most likely an officer in the army of the Western Gokturks led by Böri Shad in the wake of Ziebel's (or Tong Yabghu Khagan's) victory in the Third Persian-Turkic War. Chorpan Tarkhan ambushed and killed a 10,000-strong Persian cavalry force sent by Shahrbaraz to contain the invasion.

References

Peter B. Golden. Khazar Studies: An Historio-Philological Inquiry into the Origins of the Khazars. Budapest: Akadémiai Kiadó, 1980.
Lev Gumilev. The Gokturks. Moscow, 1967.

Khazar generals
630
7th-century military personnel
7th century in Armenia
7th-century Turkic people